Odesa Oblast is the largest wine-growing region in Ukraine. As of 2018, wine production in Odeshchyna (Odesa Oblast) coverered 26.29 thousand hectares - 60.44% of the total area of vineyards in Ukraine. 

The region is located in the favorable climate of the northwestern Black Sea coast, from the mouth of the Danube River to the Tylihul Estuary. According to 2015 data, grape production is carried out in 13 out of 26 districts (according to the previous administrative-territorial division of Ukraine). Agricultural enterprises produced 2,966,984.57 quintals of grapes in 2018.

As of 2018, the largest share of the production of wine products belongs to grape must - 57.88%, in second place - the production of wine with an actual alcohol concentration of no more than 15% - 24.08%. The third place in the region belongs to the production of sparkling wine from fresh grapes - 10.77. The region includes the Black Sea and Bessarabian wine regions. The history of wine making in the Odesa region dates back to ancient times.

History

Even before the Greek colonization of the Black Sea area, the local inhabitants of the region already supported winemaking. However, the craft became more wide spread during Greek colonization in ancient times. This area was under the influence of the Greeks until the middle of the 2nd century BC.

After the conquest of the province of Dacia by Emperor Trajan in 105-106, these lands were influenced by the Romans, who actively colonized this region. After the transition of the Roman troops to the south in 271, a part of the colonists remained in the area, who passed on the experience of breeding grape varieties and wine making methods to the native population. The successful acclimatization of the grape vine is connected with the technological revolution of the farms of the Northern Black Sea region.

The first written mention of the late modern era is a letter from Voivode Stefan Chmielecki, who presented "one vineyard" to the family of Nikoa Varzar and his brother Theodore (1600-1625). There is evidence from Skendo, which reports on the case of wine delivery to Moscow in 1790.

After the capture of Ochakov in 1788, Prince Potemkin provided the colonists and Ukrainians with vineyards in Slobodzia, Iași, Biliaivka, and Ovidiopol. In general, the modern territory of the Odesa Oblast encompassed fully or partially the Ananyiv, Odesa, Izmail, Akkerman, and Balta districts.

In the 19th century, a large number of representatives of various nationalities settled in Odesa, which contributed to the spread of winemaking in the region. So, from Izmail and Kiliia to the Dniester Estuary, Armenian settlements spread. Bulgarians founded their villages nearby, and the first German colonists from the Duchy of Warsaw, and later from Württemberg and Alsace, arrived here. The Greek uprising prompted refugees from Thrace and the Archipelago to move to new lands. They settled in Ishmael, Reni and Akkerman. Ukrainians and Moldovans (Romanians) immigrated from Ukraine (Podilia), and educated farmers immigrated from French Switzerland. All this provided the definition of the region as "America of the Old World."

The first vineyard in Odesa, "for the purpose of horticulture and wine making," was founded in 1798 by a retired major of the Greek battalion in Moldavanka, near Vodnaya Balka. Seedlings were brought from Ackerman, but not all took root and vines were delivered from France and Spain. The first barrels of cultured wine were corked here.

In 1809, Richelieu founded "real tree plantations" at this place, which today is called Dyukivsky Park.

Odesa merchant Ivan Rubo planted 250,000 grape vines and had nurseries with 130,000 French seedlings on his hundred acres of land near the Tiraspol tract. According to the statistics of the Odesa city authorities, in Odesa alone in 1807 there were 8 vineyards with an area of more than 10 acres, from 1812-1818 there were 54, and in 1827 there were more than 162 of them. According to the same statistics of 1860, Odesa produced 32 thousand barrels of wine, colonists and state peasants - more than 40 thousand barrels each, and landowners - approximately 5 thousand barrels.

The years 1820-1850 are characterized by rapid growth, then by a decrease until 1890, and later by an increase until 1913 of the wine-growing area in Odesa. From 1885 to 1910 were the most productive years for the wine industry of the region, which today (the 21st century) is called the Odesa Oblast. The area of vineyards has grown to 7 thousand hectares. Approximately one million poods of wine, mostly Bessarabian wine from Akkerman, with only a third being from the Crimea and the Caucasus were imported into Odesa itself annually.

Imports are small, 20,000 poods in wooden containers. There are strong wines: Marsala, Madeira, Sherry and up to 40,000 bottles of sparkling wines. 600-700 thousand poods were exported to various cities of the Russian Empire through the port and by rail. There were companies owned by Nuvo, Sinadino, Rosenblatt, Bernstein, Guinand, Bolgarov, Syrogos, Fischer, Rabinovich and the factories of the Winery Society (1,300,000 rubles in assets) and Roederer (500,000 rubles).

After the start of the Great War and the Russian Revolution in 1914-1922, plantations were massively destroyed, but from the mid-1920s, during the New Economic Policy (NEP) policy and later, wine making was partially restored until 1936. In 1931, the People's Commissariat of Land Affairs of the Ukrainian SSR appropriated the winery named after V. Tairov on the Sukhyi Estuary to the Institute of Viticulture and Wine making. At the same time, it was actually forbidden to cite and popularize scientists, breeders, and specialists who developed wine making in Odesa until 1917.

After the Second World War and collectivization, there was a decline in production again. Already in the 1950s and until the end of the 1970s, the rise of the wine industry began.

A new segment of the rapid development of wine making in Odesa Oblast occurred in the 1960s: then the area of our vineyards almost equaled those of Moldova and "Odessovkhozvintrest," which united 26 wine state farms and 13 wineries, and produced as many products as Crimean associations. At the end of the 1980s of the last century, the Odesa region produced 3.2 million litres of wine, and more than 10 million bottles of champagne were produced.

Viticulture in Odesa region reached its greatest development in 1981-1985: 18,500 hectares of new vineyards were planted. Vineyards occupied 2% of the area of agricultural land in the region, at the same time they provided 15% of cash receipts and up to 25% of profit from the sale of plant products.

Prohibition of perestroika led to the mass extermination of the wine industry. According to economists' calculations, in 1985–1990, Odesa Oblast lost almost 1 billion dollars in the grape and wine-making complex. 
Over the past thirty years, the area of grape plantations has decreased by more than 2.5 times. Gross turnover also decreased by 2.2 times. Over the past thirty years, more than 50,000 hectares of vineyards in the Odesa Oblast have been uprooted.

Climate and geology

The natural and climatic conditions of the southern regions of Odesa Oblast are favorable for growing grapes.

The territory of the Odesa region stretches in the meridional direction from 45°11' to 48°12' north latitude.

The climate is humid and temperate. In general, the climate of the Odesa region combines continental and maritime features. Winter is mild, with little snow and unstable; the average January temperature is from -2 °C in the south to -5 °C in the north. Spring is characterized by gloomy weather and fog due to the cooling effect of the sea.

Summer is mostly hot and dry; the average temperature in July is from 21 °C in the northwest to 23 °C in the south, maximum up to 36–39 °C (more in recent years). Autumn is long, warmer than spring, and mostly cloudy. The average annual temperature ranges from 8.2 °C in the north to 10.8 °C in the south of the region.

The total amount of precipitation is 340-470 mm per year, mainly falling in summer (often in the form of showers). The number of hours of sunlight is approximately 2200 per year. The duration of the growing season is 168-210 days with the total temperature from 28 °C to 34 °C.

North and south-west winds prevail in winter, north-west and north in summer. The southern half of the region is prone to droughts, dust storms, and dry winds.

Soil and climatic zones

The main types of wine making soils in the Odesa region are southern chernozems and ordinary chernozems.

Vineyards located on ordinary chernozems occupy an area of 25,873 hectares - 66.4%, and on southern chernozems - 13,076 hectares - 33.6%.

The Odesa region is divided into the western forest-steppe elevated wide-wave, Tiligulo-Kuchurgan, Dniester-Tiligul, Transnistrian floodplain, Odesa plain, central wide-wave, and Bolgrad natural-vine soil and climate zones.

 The western forest-steppe elevated broad-wave soil-climatic zone is located on ordinary chernozems, which includes the Bereziv and Velikomykhailiv administrative districts. The main wine making is from table grapes, and technical varieties for the production of table wines and champagne.

 The Tiligulo-Kuchurganska, Dniester-Tiligulska, Pridnestrovska floodplain, and Odesa plain soil-climatic zone is located on ordinary and southern chernozems. It is attributed to the Tarutynskyi, Bilhorod-Dnistrovskyi, Saratskyi, Rozdilnianskyi, Bilyaivskyi, and Ovidiopolskyi districts. This zone has favorable conditions for the production of table grapes, as well as the production of champagne and cognac wines, and table dry and semi-dry table wines.

 The central broad-wave soil-climatic zone is located on ordinary and southern micellar-carbonate chernozems. It is located in the Artsyzsky, Saratsky and central parts of the Bilhorod-Dniester district, and the Tatarbunarsky south-eastern part of the Bilhorod-Dniester district on chernozem micellar-carbonate, turf-sandy and clay-sandy soils. This zone has favorable conditions for the winemaking of table wines, champagne and cognac wines, strong and dessert wines.

 The Bolgrad natural grape soil-climatic zone refers to the Bolgrad region, the southern part of the Rheny region, the eastern and western Izmail regions on southern micellar carbonate chernozems, as well as the Kili region without the Danube region. It also includes the Danube floodplain natural grape-growing region with the Danube parts of the Izmail, Kili, and Reniya districts on chernozems of southern micellar carbonate and alluvial turf soils in the Danube floodplain.

Gallery

See also 
Ukrainian wine
Shabo, Odesa Oblast
Mikhail Reva

References

Sources 

 
 

 

 

 

 

Agriculture in Ukraine
Winemaking
Odesa Oblast